The 2019 Suzhou Ladies Open was a professional tennis tournament played on outdoor hard courts. It was the eighth edition of the tournament which was part of the 2019 ITF Women's World Tennis Tour. It took place in Suzhou, China between 14 and 20 October 2019.

Singles main-draw entrants

Seeds

 1 Rankings are as of 7 October 2019.

Other entrants
The following players received wildcards into the singles main draw:
  Feng Shuo
  Liu Yanni
  Sun Xuliu
  Yuan Yi

The following player received entry using a special exempt:
  Gao Xinyu

The following players received entry from the qualifying draw:
  Guo Hanyu
  Guo Meiqi
  Jiang Xinyu
  Peangtarn Plipuech
  Sun Ziyue
  Clara Tauson
  Wang Meiling
  Emily Webley-Smith

Champions

Singles

 Peng Shuai def.  Zhu Lin, 6–2, 3–6, 6–2

Doubles

 Jiang Xinyu /  Tang Qianhui def.  Ankita Raina /  Rosalie van der Hoek, 3–6, 6–3, [10–5]

References

External links
 2019 Suzhou Ladies Open at ITFtennis.com

2019 ITF Women's World Tennis Tour
2019 in Chinese tennis
2019